Grease ice is a very thin, soupy layer of frazil crystals clumped together, which makes the ocean surface resemble an oil slick. Grease ice is the second stage in the formation of solid sea ice after ice floes and then frazil ice.

New sea ice formation takes place throughout the winter in the Arctic.  The first ice that forms in a polynya are loose ice crystals called frazil ice.  If the level of turbulence is sufficient, the frazil ice will be mixed down into the upper layer and form a surface layer of grease ice.  

The term ‘grease ice’ follows World Meteorological Organization nomenclature.  Grease ice differs from ‘slush’, where slush is similarly created by snow falling into the top layer of an ocean basin, river, or lake.  The two terms are related due to the process of ice crystals being blown into a polynya which can be the initiation of the grease ice layer, given a minimum level of mixing and cooling of the ocean surface.

Formation
When the water surface begins to lose heat rapidly, the water becomes supercooled. Turbulence, caused by strong winds or flow from a river, will mix the supercooled water throughout its entire depth. The supercooled water will already be encouraging the formation of small ice crystals (frazil ice) and the crystals will be mixed into the upper layer and form a surface layer.

Sea ice growth in turbulent water differs from sea ice growth in calm water.  In turbulent water, the ice crystals accumulate at the surface, forming a grease-ice layer composed of individual ice crystals and small irregular clumps of ice crystals.  In calm water conditions, nilas, a thick elastic crust, forms at the surface, which thickens as water molecules freeze to the ice-water interface.

References 

Sea ice
Snow or ice weather phenomena